Vitaliy Oleksandrovych Mentey (born 19 April 1992) is a Ukrainian footballer who plays as a midfielder for FC Chernihiv.

Career
Mentey started his career at FC Yunist Chernihiv in Chernihiv. In 2009, he moved to FC Yednist' Plysky. In 2013 he moved to Avangard Korukivka.

FC Chernihiv 
In summer 2020 he moved to FC Chernihiv in the Ukrainian Second League. On 24 October, he made his debut against FC Uzhhorod. On 27 August, he scored against Dinaz Vyshhorod. On 28 November, he scored two goals against AFSC Kyiv. On November 24, 2022 he scores his first goal in Ukrainian First League against Hirnyk-Sport Horishni Plavni.

Career statistics

Club

Honours
Avanhard Kriukivka
 Chernihiv Oblast Football Championship: 2013
 Chernihiv Oblast Football Cup 2013

Yednist' Plysky 2
 Chernihiv Oblast Football Championship: 2011

Yednist' Plysky 
 Ukrainian Amateur Cup Runner-Up: 2013

References

External links
 Vitaliy Mentey at FC Chernihiv 
 
 

1992 births
Living people
Footballers from Chernihiv
Ukrainian footballers
Association football midfielders
FC Yunist Chernihiv players
FC Chernihiv players
FC Avanhard Koriukivka players
Ukrainian Second League players
Ukrainian First League players